Christopher Samuel Bond (born March 6, 1939) is an American attorney, politician and former United States Senator from Missouri and a member of the Republican Party. First elected to the U.S. Senate in 1986, he defeated Democrat Harriett Woods by a margin of 53%–47%. He was re-elected in 1992, 1998, and 2004. On January 8, 2009, he announced that he would not seek re-election to a fifth term in 2010, and was succeeded by fellow Republican Roy Blunt on January 3, 2011. Following his retirement from the Senate, Bond became a partner at Thompson Coburn.

Before beginning his 24-year long career in the U.S. Senate, Bond served two non-consecutive terms as Governor of Missouri, from 1973 to 1977 and from 1981 to 1985. He was previously State Auditor of Missouri from 1971 to 1973.

Early life, education, and law career
A sixth-generation Missourian, Bond was born in St. Louis, Missouri, the son of Elizabeth (née Green) and Arthur D. Bond. His father was captain of the 1924 Missouri Tigers football team and a Rhodes Scholar.  His maternal grandfather, A.P. Green, founded A.P. Green Industries, a fireclay manufacturer and a major employer for many years in Bond's hometown Mexico, Missouri. He was the benefactor and namesake of A. P. Green Chapel at the University of Missouri.

Bond graduated from Deerfield Academy in 1956 and then attended Princeton University and graduated in 1960 with an A.B. from the Woodrow Wilson School of Public and International Affairs. He completed a 162-page senior thesis that year titled "Missouri Farm Organizations and the Problems of Agriculture". While a student at Princeton, Bond was a member of the Quadrangle Club. He graduated first in his class from the University of Virginia School of Law in 1963 with a J.D.

Bond served as a law clerk (1963–64) to the Honorable Elbert Tuttle, then Chief Judge on the United States Court of Appeals for the Fifth Circuit in Atlanta, Georgia. Bond practiced law (1964–67) at Covington & Burling in Washington, D.C.

Early political career

Bond moved back to his hometown of Mexico, Missouri in the fall of 1967, and ran for Congress in 1968 in Missouri's 9th congressional district, the rural northeastern part of the state. He defeated Anthony Schroeder in the August Republican primary, 56% to 44%, winning 19 of the district's 23 counties.

In the November general election, Bond came close to defeating incumbent Democratic U.S. Congressman Bill Hungate, 48% to 52%. Bond won eight of the district's 23 counties. Out of Hungate's five re-election campaigns, that 1968 election against Bond was his worst performance.

State Attorney General John Danforth hired Bond as an Assistant Attorney General in 1969, where Bond led the office's Consumer Protection Division. In 1970, at the age of 31, Bond was elected Missouri State Auditor.

Governor of Missouri

In 1972, Bond was elected governor of Missouri by a margin of 55% to 45%, making him, at 33 years of age, the youngest governor in the history of Missouri. Bond was the first Republican in 28 years to serve as governor of Missouri. Bond's residency qualifications to be governor were challenged, but were upheld by the Missouri Supreme Court in 1972. Missouri law said the governor had to be a resident for 10 years. In the 10 years before his run, he had attended law school in Virginia, clerked for a federal appeals court judge in Atlanta, worked for a firm in Washington, D.C., applied to take the bar in Virginia and Georgia, registered a car in Washington, D.C., and applied for a marriage license in Kentucky. The Court sided with him, commenting that residence "is largely a matter of intention" and did not require "actual, physical presence". The court ruled a residence was "that place where a man has his true, fixed and permanent home and principal establishment, and to which whenever he is absent he has the intention of returning."

For the 1976 United States presidential election, he was on the short list to be Gerald Ford's vice-presidential running mate. In many ways, Bond governed as a moderate during his first term as governor: for example, he drew criticism from conservatives for his support of the Equal Rights Amendment. On June 25, 1976, he signed an executive order rescinding the Extermination Order against Mormons issued by Governor Lilburn Boggs on October 27, 1838.

In a surprising upset in 1976, Bond was narrowly defeated for re-election by Democrat Joseph P. Teasdale, then Jackson County Prosecutor. In 1980, Bond made a successful comeback, defeating fellow Republican and incumbent Lieutenant Governor Bill Phelps in the primary, and Teasdale in November. Among Bond's most noted accomplishments was helping take the Parents As Teachers program statewide. Bond served as the Chairman of the Midwestern Governors Association in 1977 and 1983. Bond was succeeded as governor in 1985 by John Ashcroft, a Republican who Bond had appointed to complete his unexpired term as State Auditor after he was elected governor. Ashcroft later served alongside Bond in the Senate.

U.S. Senate

Elections
After Senator Thomas Eagleton decided not to run for re-election, Bond was elected senator in 1986, defeating Lieutenant Governor Harriett Woods by 53% to 47% . Bond was re-elected in 1992 by less than expected over St. Louis County Councilwoman Geri Rothman-Serot, ex-wife of former Lieutenant Governor Ken Rothman. In 1998 Bond decisively defeated Attorney General (and future Governor) Jay Nixon and Libertarian Tamara Millay after a hard-fought campaign, and in 2004 he won re-election over Democratic challenger State Treasurer Nancy Farmer with 56 percent of the vote.

Facing the expiration of his fourth full term in January 2011, Bond announced on January 8, 2009, that he did not plan to seek a fifth term and would not run for re-election in November 2010. Representative Roy Blunt held the seat for the Republicans, defeating Democratic Secretary of State Robin Carnahan.

Tenure

Environmental record
The environmental watchdog group Republicans for Environmental Protection (REP) has given Bond an exceptionally low rating of −2 for the 109th United States Congress, citing anti-environment votes on seven out of seven issues deemed critical by the organization. According to the 2006 REP scorecard, Bond supported oil drilling both offshore and in the Arctic National Wildlife Refuge, while opposing a bill for "efficiency and renewable-resource programs to improve energy security, lower costs, and reduce energy-related environmental impacts". He has been cited as favoring zero-carbon energy from nuclear power.

Taxes
Commenting on an IRS spokesman's claim that a person catching a record-breaking home run ball from Mark McGwire could be "responsible for paying any applicable tax on any large gift", which was thought to be close to $140,000 in this circumstance, Bond said: "If the IRS wants to know why they are the most hated federal agency in America, they need look no further than this."

Torture
Bond has opposed setting forth interrogation methods used by the Central Intelligence Agency to conform to the U.S. Army Field Manual. While drawing criticism for being one of only nine senators to oppose such a bill, Bond said on the floor that he does not favor or approve of torture.

In a memo to CIA director John Brennan and others, he suggested banning specific techniques that could be considered torture in order to encourage servicemen to invent others on their own. He does not approve of making interrogation techniques public information on the basis that it would allow enemy combatants to train and prepare themselves for what they might go through if captured. He drew criticism when, during a debate he made a comment comparing waterboarding to swimming, stating "There are different ways of doing it. It's like swimming, freestyle, backstroke", in response to the question "do you think that waterboarding... constitutes torture?"

Free trade
Bond has been a great supporter of expanding free trade to the third world, and he believes in giving presidential authority to fast track trade relations. He has voted for the North American Free Trade Agreement (NAFTA) and the Central America Free Trade Agreement (CAFTA) and believes in permanently normalizing trade relations with China and Vietnam.

Government reform
While Bond voted in favor in banning members of Congress from receiving gifts from lobbyists, he has generally opposed campaign reform. He voted against the McCain Feingold Act for bipartisan campaign finance solutions. Bond also voted against limiting contributions from corporations or labor.

Social issues
Bond received an 11% rating from the NAACP. He has voted consistently against same-sex marriage, supporting the proposed constitutional ban of it.

On June 25, 1976, Bond officially ordered the recension of Executive Order Number 44 issued by Lilburn W. Boggs in 1838 that ordered the expulsion or extermination of all Mormons from the State of Missouri and issued an apology to Mormons on behalf of all Missourians.

As governor of the state of Missouri in 1983, Bond signed a declaration of recognition in support of the group known as the Northern Cherokee, now called the Northern Cherokee Nation of the Old Louisiana Territory attempting to grant a form of State recognition by way of executive order.  This act was part of the group's attempt to gain Federal Recognition and to receive the related benefits for the group.

Dismissal of U.S. attorneys controversy

In October 2008, Bond apologized to former U.S. Attorney Todd Graves, after a U.S. Justice Department report cited Bond for forcing Graves out over a disagreement with Representative Sam Graves. Following the report, Attorney General Michael Mukasey appointed a special prosecutor to investigate whether former Attorney General Alberto Gonzales and other officials involved in the firings of nine U.S. attorneys broke the law. Citizens for Responsibility and Ethics in Washington (CREW), a progressive activist group, filed an Ethics Committee complaint against Bond over his role in the ouster of Graves.

In 2009, it was revealed according to White House documents that Graves was put on a dismissal list a month after White House e-mail indicated that his replacement was part of a deal between Bond and the Bush administration. The e-mail suggested that Graves was replaced with a candidate favored by Bond for clearing the way for an appointment of a federal judge from Arkansas on the 8th Circuit Court of Appeals.

Committee assignments
Committee on Appropriations
Subcommittee on Agriculture, Rural Development, Food and Drug Administration, and Related Agencies
Subcommittee on Defense
Subcommittee on Energy and Water Development
Subcommittee on Financial Services and General Government
Subcommittee on State, Foreign Operations, and Related Programs
Subcommittee on Transportation, Housing and Urban Development, and Related Agencies (Ranking Member)
Committee on Environment and Public Works
Subcommittee on Clean Air and Nuclear Safety
Subcommittee on Green Jobs and the New Economy (Ranking Member)
Subcommittee on Superfund, Toxics and Environmental Health
Committee on Small Business and Entrepreneurship
Select Committee on Intelligence (Vice Chairman)

Post-government career
After leaving office in January 2011, Bond joined the law firm of Thompson Coburn.

Bond serves as a co-chair of the Housing Commission at the Bipartisan Policy Center.

In August 2011, Bond announced that he would join alliantgroup's strategic advisory board and serve as a senior adviser for the firm.

Bond formally launched his own firm, Kit Bond Strategies, in November 2011.

Missouri Apollo 17 goodwill Moon rock
In the last few days of his long political career, Kit Bond and his staff solved a mystery that had intrigued the press, Missouri politicians, and members of academia for much of 2010. Missouri state officials had wrongly believed that the state museum held a rare and valuable Apollo 17 lunar sample display containing a "goodwill Moon rock". On June 8, 2010, the state realized that what they actually had was only the Missouri Apollo 11 lunar sample display containing small samples of Moon dust rather than the $5-million piece of Apollo 17 history.
In cleaning out his senatorial office in December 2010, it was discovered that Bond had inadvertently taken the Apollo 17 display when he had left the governor's office. He subsequently returned the display to the governor of Missouri at the time, Jay Nixon, who passed it on to the Missouri State Museum. Bond was one of four former governors who had taken their states' lunar sample displays upon leaving office; the other three were the former governors of Colorado, West Virginia, and Arkansas.

Personal life
Bond's son Sam graduated in 2003 from Princeton University, after which he became an officer in the United States Marine Corps and served multiple tours of duty in Iraq. Sam later entered a career in business.

In 1994, Bond's wife, Carolyn, filed for a divorce, which was finalized the following year. Bond married Linda Pell, now Linda Bond, in 2002. She grew up in the Kansas City suburb of Gladstone and is a partner of a fundraising firm that supports Republican organizations. She and Bond had dated in the late 1990s then again a few years later before they were engaged. It is her second marriage as well.

After winning his second term as governor, Bond sued his investment manager and Paine Webber, alleging his $1.3 million trust fund had been drained. He was one of several clients who sued, and he settled in 1996 for $900,000.

In 2009, Bond co-authored a book with Lewis Simons entitled The Next Front: Southeast Asia and the Road to Global Peace with Islam.

Bond has permanent vision loss in one eye, which he attributes to undiagnosed amblyopia during childhood.

Places named after
Christopher S. Bond Bridge (Hermann, Missouri)
Christopher S. Bond Bridge, Kansas City
Christopher S. Bond United States Courthouse, Jefferson City
Christopher S. Bond Life Sciences Center – University of Missouri (Columbia), Columbia, Missouri
Christopher S. "Kit" Bond Science and Technology Incubator – Missouri Western State University, St. Joseph, Missouri
 Kit Bond Visitor Center (USACE project office) Stockton, Missouri

Electoral history
After over 40 years in politics, Senator Bond announced on January 8, 2009, that he would not seek re-election in 2010. Results of elections in which he was a candidate are summarized as follows:

U.S. Senator
2004 United States Senate election in Missouri
{|
|Kit Bond (R) (inc.) 56%
|-
|Nancy Farmer (D) 42.8%
|-
|Kevin Tull (Lib.) 0.7%
|-
|Don Griffin (Constitution) 0.4%
|}

1998 United States Senate election in Missouri
{|
|Kit Bond (R) (inc.) 52.7%
|-
|Jay Nixon (D) 43.8%
|-
|Tamara Millay (Lib.) 2%
|-
|Curtis Frazier (U.S. Taxpayers) 1%
|-
|James F. Newport (Reform) 0.5%
|}

1992 United States Senate election in Missouri
{|
|Kit Bond (R) (inc.) 51.9%
|-
|Geri Rothman-Serot (D) 44.9%
|-
|Jeanne Bojarski (Lib.) 3.2%
|}

United States Senate election in Missouri, 1986
{|
|Kit Bond (R) 52.6%
|-
|Harriett Woods (D) 47.4%
|}

As Governor of Missouri
Missouri gubernatorial election, 1980
{|
|Kit Bond (R) 52.6%
|-
|Joseph P. Teasdale (D) (Inc.) 47%
|-
|Helen Savio (Socialist Workers) 0.3%
|}

Missouri gubernatorial election, 1976
{|
|Joseph P. Teasdale (D) 50.2%
|-
|Kit Bond (R) (Inc.) 49.6%
|-
|Others 0.2%
|}

Missouri gubernatorial election, 1972
{|
|Kit Bond (R) 55.2%
|-
|Edward L. Dowd (D) 45.6%
|-
|Paul J. Leonard (Nonpartisan) 0.3%
|}

Footnotes

External links

Lawmakers Investigate CIA Interrogation Tape Disposal  PBS Newshour, December 11, 2007, transcript of interview with Gwen Ifill

|-

|-

|-

|-

|-

|-

|-

|-

1939 births
21st-century American politicians
American politicians with disabilities
American Presbyterians
Deerfield Academy alumni
Lawyers from Washington, D.C.
Living people
People associated with Covington & Burling
People from Mexico, Missouri
Politicians from St. Louis
Princeton School of Public and International Affairs alumni
Republican Party governors of Missouri
Republican Party United States senators from Missouri
State Auditors of Missouri
University of Virginia School of Law alumni
Members of Congress who became lobbyists